The following are the national records in Olympic weightlifting in Philippines. Records are maintained in each weight class for the snatch lift, clean and jerk lift, and the total for both lifts by the Samahang Weightlifting ng Pilipinas.

Men

Women

References

External links

records
Philippines
Olympic weightlifting
weightlifting